Berberis agricola is a plant species endemic to Xizang (Tibet). It grows on mountain slopes at elevations of 3200–3600 m.

Berberis agricola is a deciduous shrub up to 2 m tall, with spines up to 15 mm long along the younger twigs. Leaves are obovate, up to 25 mm long, dark green above, lighter green below. Flowers are borne in a raceme of up to 30 flowers.

References

agricola
Endemic flora of Tibet
Plants described in 1961